Combat Sergeant is an American television program that originally aired on ABC from June to September 1956. Starring Michael Thomas as Sergeant Nelson, the series was set in Africa during World War II. Actual footage of the war was spliced into episodes. 13 episodes were filmed.

Combat Sergeant was produced by National Telefilm Associates, and had originally been intended as a first-run syndicated program; it was offered to individual television stations in March 1956, but saw no sales. The series was offered to ABC, which purchased the program. After a brief summer run on ABC in 1956, the series was rerun on the syndicated NTA Film Network starting in summer 1957.

References

External links
 

1956 American television series debuts
1956 American television series endings
Black-and-white American television shows
English-language television shows
American Broadcasting Company original programming
World War II television drama series
Television series based on actual events